The Maldives National University (Dhivehi: ދިވެހިރާއްޖޭގެ ޤައުމީ ޔުނިވަރސިޓީ) is a public university located in the Maldives.

In 1973, the first Ministry of health was created at MNU. In 1974, the vocational and trade center was established, providing mechanical and electrical trades. In 1984 the institution for Teacher education was created. In 1987 a tourism school was established for the sole purpose of tourism in the Maldives. In 1991 The Institute of Management and Administration was created; in order, to train staff for public and private services. In 1998 The Maldives College of Higher Education was founded. In January 1999 the Institute of Shar’ah and law was founded. In 2000 College launched first-degree Program: Bachelor of Arts. On 17 January 2011 The Maldives National University Act was passed by the President of the Maldives, The Maldives National University got its name on 15 February 2011.

History
MCHE was established on 1 October 1998 by the government of Maldives. Though what is today known as MCHE was there since 1973 as Allied Health Services Training Centre which later was renamed as Faculty of Health Sciences established by the Ministry of Health. The college was administered by a council called College Council, headed by late Abdul Sattar Moosa Didi.

Faculties
Faculty of Arts
Faculty of Education
Faculty of Engineering, Science and Technology
Faculty of Health Sciences
Faculty of Hospitality and Tourism Studies
Faculty of Shariah and Law
School of Nursing
School of Medicine
MNU Business School
Centre for Maritime Studies
Centre for Educational Technology and Excellence
Centre for Foundation Studies

Notable Alumni 

 Ahmed Ahsan, Chief Diving Officer of MNDF Marine Corps is a notable alumni.

References

Universities in the Maldives
Malé
Educational institutions established in 1973
1970s establishments in the Maldives